Sociedad Anónima Damm is a Spanish brewery founded in Barcelona in 1876 by the Alsatian August Kuentzmann Damm and Joseph Damm. It is the main brewery in the city.

Products 
Its best known beer products include the following four:
Estrella Damm, formerly "Estrella Dorada", a pale beer, one of the most popular beers in the Barcelona area. It has been brewed since 1876. Its bottles and caps used to display a characteristic golden star on white ground. Now the star on the cans is on a red background.
Voll-Damm imitates a German-style Märzen beer. It has more body and a higher alcohol content than Estrella. Its dark-green coloured labels display writing in the Gothic script.
Xibeca is a low-alcohol grade table-beer coming in large, low-priced one-liter bottles. "Xibeca" was meant to be consumed along with meals, as a cheap substitute for red table wine when the prices of table wines rose at the end of the 1960s. It was very popular among the low-middle class in Catalonia during the 1970s.
Estrella Levante (es) Clásica is a pilsner lager produced in Espinardo, Murcia. It has been brewed since 1963. Other beers are Especial, Skol, and Punta del Este.

Other Damm products include Inedit, Bock Damm, Free-Damm, A.K. Damm, among others. Damm also produces a range of Gluten-reduced beers under the Daura label, including a Lager and a Märzen.

Corporate Activity 
In 2018, the shareholding was formed by the Canarian oil company Disa Corporación Petrolífera (33%), owned by the Carceller family, the German food group Dr. Oetker (25%), Seegrund (13.95%), also controlled by the Carceller family and Demetrio Carceller Arce himself (0.083%). The rest of the company's shareholders are several historical families and descendants of the founder, August Kuentzmann Damm, La Moràvia d'Inversions (Armadàs family, 6%) and Boag Valores (Agenjo family, 5%).

In 2022, Carlsberg Marstons Brewing Company announced it will sell the Eagle Brewery in Bedford, England to S.A. Damm. The Eagle Brewery has packaged Estrella Damm since 2010.

Sponsorship 
During the heyday of baseball in Spain in the 1950s and 1960s, Damm sponsored a local baseball team, Picadero Damm. During the 1960s, Damm was also known for marketing its beer at all members of the family, including children.

Shareholders

Stockholdings

References

External links 
 Official homepage 

Companies established in 1876
Food and drink companies based in Barcelona
Manufacturing companies based in Barcelona
Breweries in Spain
1876 establishments in Spain
Spanish brands